The 2010 Rushmoor Council election took place on 6 May 2010 to elect members of Rushmoor Borough Council in Hampshire, England. One third of the council was up for election and the Conservative Party stayed in overall control of the council.

After the election, the composition of the council was:
Conservative 30
Liberal Democrat 6
Labour 6

Election result
The results saw the Conservatives retain control of the council after winning 10 of the 14 seats contested, compared to 2 each for the Liberal Democrat and Labour parties. The Conservatives gained one seat from the Liberal Democrats in Farnborough and regained another from the United Kingdom Independence Party (UKIP) where the former councillor had defected from the Conservatives to UKIP. Among the winners was the first Asian woman to be elected to Rushmoor council, Sophia Choudhary, who won for the Conservatives in Rowhill ward.

Ward results

References

2010
2010 English local elections
May 2010 events in the United Kingdom
2010s in Hampshire